Arnager is a small fishing village in Rønne parish, Bornholm island, Denmark. Its population in 2010 was 151 residents. Arnager Bay is east of Arnager.

According to Bornholm Place Names, Arnager was first mentioned in 1552 as "Arenack" in one of the Chancery letter books. The harbor was built in 1883 by H. Zahrtmann. For some time, the village was one of the main resting places for the island's missionaries. The city is notable for having Scandinavia's longest wooden bridge. The  structure links the port with the city.

References

Bornholm
Rønne
Cities and towns in the Capital Region of Denmark
Port cities and towns of the Baltic Sea